Cinemateca Portuguesa is a film archive located in Lisbon. It was established in 1948.

The Cinemateca Portuguesa provides film festivals, film screenings, presentations, a museum exhibition, a bookshop, and a restaurant. It is located in Rua Barata Salgueiro.

Between 2001 and 2002 the restoration work of the building was carried out by architects Alberto Castro Nunes and António Maria Braga, winners of the 2019 Rafael Manzano Prize.

See also
 List of film archives
 Cinema of Portugal
 List of archives in Portugal

References

External links
 Cinemateca Portuguesa website

1948 establishments in Portugal
Organizations established in 1948
Archives in Portugal
Film archives in Europe
Organisations based in Lisbon
Tourist attractions in Lisbon
Culture in Lisbon
Museums in Lisbon
Cinema museums